Chidinma and Chidiebere Aneke  (born 6 August 1986) are identical twins in the Nollywood industry popularly known as the Aneke twins. They were born in the south eastern part of Nigeria, precisely Enugu State and they are the last issue to the Aneke family. They are actresses and movie producers

Early life and education 
Chidinmma and Chidiebere were born on 6 August 1986 in Enugu State, Nigeria into a polygamous home of three wives. They had a wealthy father who ensured rosy upkeep for them but things changed when they lost their father and his properties were divided among extended family members.  They acquired their Primary School Leaving Certificate and Secondary school certificates in Enugu State. After their primary and secondary education, Chidinma and Chidiebere proceeded to University of Nigeria, Nsuka where they graduated with Bachelor in Mass Communication and Bachelor in Banking and Finance respectively.

Career 
The Aneke twins joined the Nollywood industry in 1999 and acted in the movie ‘Ebuka’ which happens to be their first movie. The movie ‘Ebuka’ gave them an edge in Nollywood. In 2004, the Aneke twins rose to fame with the movie ‘Desperate Twins’ which earned them the nomination for The Most Promising Acts to Watch at the African Magic Viewers’ Choice Award. They have acted in over 80 movies. They have produced many Nollywood movies such as; ‘Heart of Isiaku’, ‘Onochie’, ‘Broken Ambition’’, and ‘Adaora’.

Filmography 
Jealous Friends

Desperate Twins

Lagos Girls

Broken Ambition

Awards 
Humanitarian Award

References 

Identical twin actresses
Nigerian twins
University of Nigeria alumni
Actresses from Enugu State
1986 births
Nigerian film producers
Living people
Nigerian film actresses
Igbo actresses